David Kanuha, also known as David Kanuha Ainoa (July 4, 1861 - November 12, 1938) was the first Native Hawaiian teacher at Kamehameha Schools in Kalihi, Honolulu, Hawaii starting on January 27, 1893, only days after the overthrow of the Kingdom of Hawaii. He taught tailoring at school and was one of the only school staff to participate in resisting the Republican forces after the kingdoms overthrow.

He was married to Esther Staine. The couple had two children, a daughter named Gladys Kamakakuokalani Brandt and a son named David K. Ainoa. An infant son named Alfred Staine Kanuha died in 1899.

References

People from Hawaii
Hawaiian studies
1861 births
1938 deaths